The 2012 CME Group Titleholders was the second CME Group Titleholders, a women's professional golf tournament and the season-ending event on the U.S.-based LPGA Tour. It was played November 15–18, 2012 at the TwinEagles Club in Naples, Florida.

The top three finishers who were LPGA members from each official LPGA tournament, not otherwise qualified, earned a spot in the Titleholders. If tied, the player with the lower final round score qualified. 

South Korean Na Yeon Choi won by two strokes over So Yeon Ryu.

Qualifiers
The following table shows the three qualifiers for the Titleholders from each tournament.

Note: The following qualifiers did not play in the event: Katie Futcher, Lydia Ko, Lorena Ochoa, Se Ri Pak, Momoko Ueda.

Final leaderboard

References

CME Group Tour Championship
Golf in Florida
CME Group Titleholders
CME Group Titleholders
CME Group Titleholders
CME Group Titleholders